Long Service and Good Conduct Medal is a service medal awarded to personnel in various branches of the armed forces of the United Kingdom and the territories that are or were at some point a part of the British Empire or Commonwealth of Nations.

Examples include:

United Kingdom
Army Long Service and Good Conduct Medal (British Army)
Medal for Long Service and Good Conduct (Military) (British Army)
Naval Long Service and Good Conduct Medal (1830) (Royal Navy and Royal Marines)
Naval Long Service and Good Conduct Medal (1848) (Royal Navy and Royal Marines)
Royal Air Force Long Service and Good Conduct Medal (Royal Air Force)
Special Reserve Long Service and Good Conduct Medal
Volunteer Long Service Medal
Volunteer Officers' Decoration (VD)

Colonies and Dominions of the British Empire
Army Long Service and Good Conduct Medal (Cape of Good Hope)
Army Long Service and Good Conduct Medal (Natal)
Long Service and Good Conduct Medal (New Zealand)
Medal for Long Service and Good Conduct (South Africa) (pre-1952)
Permanent Forces of the Empire Beyond the Seas Medal
Volunteer Long Service Medal for India and the Colonies
Volunteer Officers' Decoration for India and the Colonies (VD)

South Africa post-1952
Good Service Medal, Bronze
Good Service Medal, Gold
Good Service Medal, Silver
Long Service Medal, Bronze (Venda)
Long Service Medal, Gold (Venda)
Long Service Medal, Silver (Venda)
Medal for Distinguished Conduct and Loyal Service
Medal for Long Service and Good Conduct, Bronze (Bophuthatswana)
Medal for Long Service and Good Conduct, Gold (Bophuthatswana)
Medal for Long Service and Good Conduct, Silver (Bophuthatswana)
Medal for Long Service, Bronze (Ciskei)
Medalje vir Troue Diens
Permanent Force Good Service Medal
Union Medal